Rónald Gómez Gómez (born 24 January 1975 in Puntarenas) is a retired Costa Rican football forward and manager. He is the current manager for Liga Nacional club Santa Lucía.

An important player on the Costa Rica national football team during the 1990s and 2000s, Gómez is regarded as one of Costa Rica's best forwards, known for his rocket shots and top dribbling.

Gómez is, along with Paulo Wanchope, the top scorer for Costa Rica in the FIFA World Cup with three goals.

Club career

Early years
Born in Puntarenas as the 12th child of Francisca Gómez, he was raised in the village Pilas de Canjel in Guanacaste Province.

Nicknamed La Bala (The Bullit), Gómez started his career at Carmelita and scored his first league goal on 20 September 1992 against Saprissa. He then scored 45 goals for Alajuelense before moving abroad.

Years abroad
He has played in 6 different countries: in Spain with Sporting Gijón and Hercules of Alicante, in Guatemala with Municipal, in Greece with OFI Crete, in Kuwait with Al Qadsia, in Mexico with Irapuato and in Cyprus with APOEL where he won the Cypriot First Division.

Saprissa
With Saprissa, he has won 4 national championship; and 1 CONCACAF Champions Cup, and was part of the team that played the 2005 FIFA Club World Championship Toyota Cup where Saprissa finished third behind São Paulo and Liverpool. He scored the winning goal in the final minutes of the game that Saprissa won in order to achieve the third place of the tournament against Al-Ittihad. His goal was considered among the best of the cup.

Return from retirement
In June 2009, Gómez came out of playing retirement for a final season at Santos after he was relegated to the second division as manager of Carmelita. After the season, he became manager of Santos.

International career
Gómez made his debut for Costa Rica in a February 1993 UNCAF Nations Cup qualification match against Nicaragua and earned a total of 93 caps, scoring 26 goals. He represented his country in 27 FIFA World Cup qualification matches and figured at the 2002 and 2006 World Cups. He also played at the 1993 and 2001 UNCAF Nations Cups
as well as at the 1993, 2000 and 2002 CONCACAF Gold Cup and the 1997, 2001, and 2004 Copa América.

His final international was a March 2008 friendly match against Peru.

International goals
Scores and results list. Costa Rica's goal tally first.

Managerial career
He made his debut as manager of Carmelita in January 2009. In October 2010 he was dismissed by Santos de Guápiles and he later managed second division sides Deportivo Cartagena and Juventud Escazuceña. In September 2013, he took charge of Guatemalan side Halcones and in May 2014 he returned to Costa Rica to take charge at Limón.

Personal life
He is married to Gina Soto and they have two sons, Esteban and Daniel.

Honours
Primera División de Costa Rica (3):
1995-96, 2005–06, 2007–08
Copa Interclubes UNCAF (1):
1996
CONCACAF Champions' Cup (1):
2005
Cypriot First Division (1):
2006–07

References

External links
 
 2006 World Cup profile - Nación

1975 births
Living people
People from Puntarenas
Association football forwards
Costa Rican footballers
Costa Rican expatriate sportspeople in Spain
Costa Rica international footballers
2002 FIFA World Cup players
2006 FIFA World Cup players
1997 Copa América players
2001 Copa América players
2004 Copa América players
1993 CONCACAF Gold Cup players
2000 CONCACAF Gold Cup players
2002 CONCACAF Gold Cup players
A.D. Carmelita footballers
L.D. Alajuelense footballers
Sporting de Gijón players
Hércules CF players
C.S.D. Municipal players
OFI Crete F.C. players
Irapuato F.C. footballers
Qadsia SC players
Deportivo Saprissa players
APOEL FC players
Santos de Guápiles footballers
Liga FPD players
Super League Greece players
La Liga players
Cypriot First Division players
Costa Rican expatriate footballers
Expatriate footballers in Spain
Expatriate footballers in Guatemala
Expatriate footballers in Greece
Expatriate footballers in Kuwait
Expatriate footballers in Mexico
Expatriate footballers in Cyprus
Costa Rican football managers
Expatriate football managers in Guatemala
Costa Rican expatriate sportspeople in Kuwait
Costa Rican expatriate sportspeople in Cyprus
Costa Rican expatriate sportspeople in Guatemala
Costa Rican expatriate sportspeople in Mexico
Costa Rican expatriate sportspeople in Greece
Kuwait Premier League players